Monadnock may refer to:

A geologic term
Monadnock or "inselberg", a generic term for isolated mountain

Names of summits
Mount Monadnock, a well-known summit in southwestern New Hampshire, United States, located in the town of Jaffrey
Monadnock Mountain (Vermont), a summit in Lemington, Vermont, United States
Pack Monadnock, a mountain in the Wapack Range of southern New Hampshire
North Pack Monadnock, a mountain in the Wapack Range of southern New Hampshire
Little Monadnock Mountain, a mountain located in southern New Hampshire in the towns of Troy and Fitzwilliam

Hiking trails
Metacomet-Monadnock Trail, a  hiking trail located in western Massachusetts and southern New Hampshire 
Monadnock-Sunapee Greenway, a  hiking trail located in southwestern New Hampshire

Architecture
The Monadnock Building, a proto-skyscraper located in the city of Chicago, Illinois
The Monadnock Building (San Francisco)

Business
Monadnock Lifetime Products, a law enforcement equipment company

Ships
USS Monadnock, various ships of the United States Navy with this name